Caricain (papaya peptidase A, papaya peptidase II, papaya proteinase, papaya proteinase III, papaya proteinase 3, proteinase omega, papaya proteinase A, chymopapain S, Pp) is an enzyme. This enzyme catalyses the following chemical reaction:

 Hydrolysis of proteins with broad specificity for peptide bonds, similar to those of papain and chymopapain

This enzyme is isolated from the papaya plant, Carica papaya.

References

External links 
 

EC 3.4.22